Truxton Depot, also known as Lehigh Valley Depot, is a historic railway depot located at Truxton in Cortland County, New York.  It was built about 1872 by the Lehigh Valley Railroad.  It is a small rectangular, one story structure, 50 feet long and 30 feet wide.  The building ceased use as a train station in 1967 and was then used by Agway as a warehouse.  In 1991, it was sold to the town of Truxton for $1.00.  It now serves as the Truxton Town Hall. 

It was listed on the National Register of Historic Places in 2008.

References

Railway stations on the National Register of Historic Places in New York (state)
Railway stations in the United States opened in 1872
Railway stations closed in 1967
Buildings and structures in Cortland County, New York
Former Lehigh Valley Railroad stations
National Register of Historic Places in Cortland County, New York